Quintet for Piano and Winds may refer to:

 Quintet for Piano and Winds (Beethoven)
 Quintet for Piano and Winds (Mozart)